Jerzy Liebert (1904–1931) was a Polish poet.

1904 births
1931 deaths
20th-century Polish poets